Since You've Been Gone is the second and final studio album released by British boyband Damage, released on 2 April 2001, two weeks after the release of the album's third single. The album was the last album to be released under the band's original tenure and the last to feature original band member Coreé Richards. The album features a number of guest vocalists, including Kele Le Roc and band member Jade Jones' long-term partner Emma Bunton. The British release contains an additional remix of "So What If I". The album contains the band's signature single "Ghetto Romance" produced and written by Grammy Winning producers Tim & Bob, as well as "Rumours", "Still Be Lovin' You" and "After the Love Has Gone".

Background
The album was initially due for release on 25 September 2000, following the release of "Rumours". However, the release date was subsequently pushed back to allow for new material to be recorded. This resulted in the album's track listing being revised. The initial track listing includes the tracks "Feelin' Me" and "Midnight Caller", as well as an outro called "Before We Leave". However, the final release omits these three tracks and instead replaces them with "I Don't Know" (featuring Emma Bunton), "After the Love Has Gone" and a Mushtaq mix of "So What If I". A "Lovestruck Garage Mix" of "Midnight Caller" was released as the B-side to "Ghetto Romance", while "Feelin' Me" was released as the B-side to "Rumours". "I Don't Know" had previously been released as the B-side to "Still Be Lovin' You", while "After the Love Has Gone" was subsequently released as a single in its own right. "Before We Leave" and the original, full version of "Midnight Caller" remain unreleased commercially.

Track listing

Charts

Weekly charts

Year-end charts

Certifications

References

2001 albums
Albums produced by Tim & Bob
Damage (British band) albums
Cooltempo Records albums